Medwyn Goodall (born in 1961) is a composer, musician and owner of record label MG Music. He is mostly associated with the New Age genre. He was born in Yorkshire, England. He lives with his wife Wendy in Cornwall, England. According to AllMusic, "Goodall began composing original songs as a teen, earning local notoriety with his band Trax; in the years to follow, he learned to play a vast range of instruments, including mandolin, piano, drums, harp, flute, glockenspiel, panpipes, vibraphone and synthesizer, and cut his first album at age 26". He is a prolific recorder, having recorded over 75 albums. He also topped the UK music charts twice and sold over three million albums. His first album was Emergence (1987), published by New World Music. His early albums were published also by Oreade Music. Medwyn Goodall started MG Music in 2003. This is a record label which specializes in New Age music.

He produced albums on which he arranged, performed, mixed and mastered every song, although his album, OM (2007), was produced together with Terry Oldfield and OM 2 (2009), was produced together with Aroshanti. There is an updated list of his albums at MG Music and at AllMusic web sites.

Many of Goodall's recent releases have been under the alias Midori. He explains that he chose this alias so he "could record projects that were more ethnic, eastern, or produced for the healing arts" without confusing fans of his other music. However, there are also other musical artists using or known by the name Midori (such as the jazz-punk combo Midori and the Japanese violinist Midori Goto).

One of Goodall's tracks, "Free Spirit" from his album Meditation & Visualisation (2001) features the same Spectrasonics "Distorted Reality" sample featured in the "Summer Forest" music in the video game Spyro 2: Ripto's Rage!, as composed by Stewart Copeland.

Discography 
This is a list of albums released by Medwyn Goodall. The list below does not contain albums released under the name Midori, Medwyn Goodall's alias for healing music.

Studio albums
1986 – Emergence
1987 – Innocence
1987 – Paradise Moon
1988 – Kindred Spirits
1988 – In the Stillness of a Moment
1989 – Angel Sleep
1989 – Gifts of Comfort and Joy
1990 – The Druid Trilogy Volume I: Druid
1990 – The Druid Trilogy Volume II: Merlin
1990 – The Druid Trilogy Volume III: Excalibur
1991 – Medicine Woman
1991 – Earth Healer
1992 – Great Spirit
1992 – The Way of the Dolphin
1992 – Kingdom of the Sun God
1993 – Eagle Spirit
1993 – Coral Sand
1993 – Antarctica, the Last Wilderness
1993 – Leo, 24 July – 23 August
1994 – Four Horsemen, The Waves of Ascension
1994 – Return to Eden, Part 2 of The Waves of Ascension Trilogy
1994 – Alpha & Omega, Part 3 of The Waves of Ascension Trilogy
1994 – Siesta
1994 – Goddess from the Sea (originally released as Neptune, God of the Oceans)
1994 – Golden Dreams, Forever (originally released as Magical Amsterdam)
1994 – Nazca, Land of the Incas
1994 – Green Dream, Chill Out 1
1995 – Purple Dream, Chill Out 2
1995 – Where Angels Tread
1995 – Guardian Spirit
1995 – Moon Goddess
1995 – The Arthurian Collection Vol. 1: The Grail Quest (originally released as Grail Quest)
1995 – The Arthurian Collection Vol. 2: The Gift of Excalibur (originally released as The Gift of Excalibur)
1996 – The Arthurian Collection Vol. 3: The Fair Queen Guinevere (originally released as Guinevere)
1996 – The Arthurian Collection Vol. 4: Tintagel, Castle of Arthur (originally released as Tintagel)
1996 – The Arthurian Collection Vol. 5: The Round Table (originally released as The Round Table)
1996 – Priestess, Return to Atlantis
1996 – Winds Across the Pacific
1996 – Alcazar, Flame of Passion
1996 – Spirit of Christmas
1996 – Shoshone Dream
1996 – King Shaman: Rhythms of the World
1997 – Ancient Nazca: Inca Mysteries
1997 – The Dolphin Quest
1997 – Clan: A Celtic Journey
1997 – The Way of the Ocean
1997 – A Christmas Tapestry
1998 – Medwyn's Cornwall
1998 – Medicine Woman II: The Gift
1998 – Wisdom of the Forest
1999 – Comet
1999 – Millennium
1999 – Music with Natural Sounds: Peaceful Garden (RSPB commission)
1999 – Clan II: The Scroll
2000 – Essence of Magic
2000 – Timeless
2000 – Lightstream
2000 – Sacred Medicine
2000 – The Dragon's Breath (originally released as Dragon's Keep)
2000 – Natural Sounds With Music: Water
2000 – Natural Sounds With Music: Island
2001 – Natural Sounds With Music: Birds
2001 – Natural Sounds With Music: Farm
2001 – Snows of Kilimanjaro
2001 – Anam Cara
2001 – Earth Love
2001 – Medwyn Goodall's Seasons: Autumn
2001 – Medwyn Goodall's Seasons: Spring
2001 – Medwyn Goodall's Seasons: Summer
2001 – Medwyn Goodall's Seasons: Winter
2001 – Natural Balance: English Summer
2001 – Natural Balance: April Showers
2001 – Natural Balance: Calm Ocean
2001 – Natural Balance: Call of the Dolphin
2001 – The Mind Body & Soul Series: Meditation & Visualisation
2002 – Rhythm of the Ancients
2003 – Chronicles: An Epic Tale in Music
2003 – Medicine Woman III: The Rising
2003 – Medwyn's Cornwall
2003 – Classics for Healing
2004 – Classics for Tranquility
2004 – Classics for Creativity
2004 – Eye of the Wolf
2005 – Tribal Nation
2005 – The Sorcerer's Daughter
2005 – OM
2006 – Earth Goddess (same as Island Bliss)
2006 – Life Style Series: Music for Crystal Healing
2006 – Life Style Series: Music for The Dolphin Experience
2006 – Life Style Series: Music for Healing
2006 – Life Style Series: Music for Perfect Sleep
2006 – Life Style Series: Music for Aromatherapy & Massage
2008 – Serve Chilled (with Tim Rock)
2008 – Amun Ra
2008 – Origins
2009 – Medicine Woman IV: Prophecy 2012
2009 – Druid II
2009 – OM 2
2010 – Clan III: The Lands Beyond
2011 – With Every Breath (with Aroshanti)
2011 – Tears of the Dragon
2011 – Knight
2012 – Earth Healer 2
2012 – Moon Goddess 2
2012 – Thunder Drums (Taiko)
2013 – The Wild Series Vol. 3: Turtle Island
2013 – Music for Children: The Light of the Moment
2014 – Dreamweaver
2014 – Medicine Woman 5: Transformation
2015 – Renaissance
2015 – Beautiful World
2016 – The Portal
2016 – Kissed by the Sun
2017 – Echoes of Emergence
2017 – The Sorcerer's Daughter 2 – The Book of Dragons 
2017 – Medicine Woman – The Lost Tracks 
2017 – Medicine Woman 6 – Synchronicity 
2018 – Great Spirit - The Lost Tracks
2018 – Great Spirit 2
2019 – Legend of the Sword (EP)
2019 – The Colour of Sound
2019 – The Goddess of Machu Picchu
2020 – The Elixir of Life
2020 – The Edge of The World
2021 – The Wolfstone
2021 – Learning to Be Free
2022 – Medicine Woman Seven

Compilations
1996 – Pagan Dawn: The Selected Music of Medwyn Goodall
1997 – All Good Things
1998 – The Best of Medwyn Goodall
2000 – Visions: The Best of Medwyn Goodall 1990-1995
2004 – King Arthur (3-CD box set)
2004 – Momentum (1990–2004)
2004 – Land of the Inca
2010 – 25 Years (25th Anniversary Best of)
2013 – Music for the Imagination: Dragons in the Mist
2013 – Music of the Goddess: She
2013 – Music for Sleep & Rejuvenation: Golden Slumbers
2013 – Music for Relaxation & Healing: Bliss
2013 – Music for Joy & Energy: Light in the Rhythm
2013 – Music for Inspiration: Inca Gold
2013 – Music for Dream & Wonder: Realm of Dreams
2014 – Essential Medwyn
2014 – The Guitar Man
2015 – Manitou the Great Spirit
2015 – Spirit Journey
2015 – The Wisdom of Ages
2017 – Stepping Stones

Singles
2013 – Sanskrit
2014 – Elven
2019 – Legend of the Sword

Miscellaneous
Autobiography – No Strings Attached
DVD – Dolphins and Sea
DVD – Medwyn Goodall's Natural World
DVD – Native Spirit
2020 – A Light in the Darkness (film)

References 

1961 births
Living people
English new-age musicians